Amelia Evelyn Voicy Baggs (born Amanda Melissa Baggs; August 15, 1980 – April 11, 2020), also known as Mel Baggs, was an American non-binary blogger who predominantly wrote on the subject of autism and disability, and became well known in the early stages of the autism rights movement. Baggs used a communication device to speak and referred to themself as a low-functioning autistic. Revelations about Baggs's past created some uncertainty about their diagnosis.

Early life 
Baggs was born in Mountain View, California on August 15, 1980 to Ronald and Anna (née Lynch) Baggs. In 1994, they attended Harker School, De Anza College and Bard College at Simon’s Rock, a college for gifted high school-aged teenagers, at age 14.  Baggs moved from California to Vermont in order to be closer to a friend in 2005.

Work
Baggs created a website titled “Getting the Truth Out,” a response to a campaign by the Autism Society of America. They claimed that the ASA's campaign made autistic people objects of pity.  They also spoke at conferences about disabilities, and worked with Massachusetts Institute of Technology scientists that were researching autism.

In January 2007, Baggs posted a video on YouTube entitled "In My Language" describing the experience of living as a person with autism, which became the subject of several articles on CNN. Baggs also guest-blogged about the video on Anderson Cooper's blog and answered questions from the audience via email.
About Baggs, Sanjay Gupta said:

Video artist Mark Leckey admitted that he is, in a sense, envious of Baggs' empathic relationship to inanimate objects. The singing at the beginning of Leckey's video "Prop4aShw" is from Baggs' "In My Language".

Baggs advocated for a consistent definition of autism awareness, claiming that awareness was misrepresented by both parents and some advocates.  They wrote articles in two online blogs: "ballastexistenz" and "Cussin’ and Discussin’".

Baggs said they named their first blog "ballastexistenz" to show that people like them were capable of living a worthy life, since it was a historical term, "", used to describe disabled people as incapable.

Personal life
Baggs described themself as genderless and nonbinary in their writings. They also identified as a lesbian and used any pronouns except it, though they preferred the neopronouns sie/hir and ze/zer. Their name was legally changed to Amelia Evelyn Voicy Baggs in 2014.

Several classmates of Baggs have found the presence of their alleged impairments to be unusual, subsequently claiming that Baggs "spoke, attended classes, dated, and otherwise acted in a completely typical fashion." According to these classmates, Baggs functioned as a typically developing adolescent, and began to suffer psychological problems after long-term use of heavy doses of psychedelic drugs, resulting in a mental breakdown, after which Baggs withdrew from Simon's Rock and spent time in a psychiatric hospital. After leaving Simon's Rock, Baggs wrote extensively on Deja News (now Google Groups) in the late 1990s, discussing their drug use and mental breakdown, stating that they had been diagnosed with schizophrenia, and theorizing that they may also have had dissociative identity disorder. Baggs later stated that they did not have DID and apologized in 1997 for having "deceived" themselves and others when their true diagnosis was for schizophrenia. In 2002, Baggs posted that they had been labeled with having Munchausen syndrome, rather than autism, by clinicians at Stanford University Medical Center, which Baggs contested the accuracy of. Baggs did not dispute those details online when questioned after their 2007 CNN appearance, but claimed a loss of all functional speech in their 20s. Additionally, other autism advocates have also questioned the validity of their diagnosis, given that Baggs did not meet many of the requirements of low functioning autism. An article in Slate stated that some of their past acquaintances had been threatened with legal action by attorneys employed by Baggs for challenging their story.

Baggs claimed that augmentative communication is somewhat common among autistic individuals, though they also supported the use of the controversial facilitated communication and other widely scientifically discredited alternative therapies. Baggs claimed to use FC, and that Fey, their cat, was their best facilitator as Fey moved their limbs around.

In addition to autism, Baggs also claimed to have been diagnosed with bipolar disorder, Munchausen syndrome, dissociative disorder, psychotic disorder, schizophrenia, and gastroparesis. They wrote about numerous other syndromes and disabilities, including obsessive–compulsive disorder, Tourette syndrome, post-traumatic stress disorder, craniofacial abnormality, synesthesia,  bronchiectasis, hypermobility, Irlen syndrome, and asthma.

Death 
Baggs died on April 11, 2020, at the age of 39 in Burlington, Vermont; their mother said that the cause of their death was believed to be respiratory failure. They were survived by their mother, two brothers, and their grandmother.

Selected works

Baggs, Amanda. "In My Language" (YouTube, 2007)

References

External links
 Ballastexistenz
 Cussin' and Discussin'
 https://ameliabaggs.wordpress.com/ (Poetry and creative writing blog)
 https://withasmoothroundstone.tumblr.com/
 Echoes from Nowhere (Musical echolalia blog)
 https://ameliabaggs.tumblr.com/ (Personal prose)

1980 births
2020 deaths
YouTubers from California
American bloggers
Autism activists
Deaths from respiratory failure
American disability rights activists
LGBT people from California
American lesbian writers
Non-binary activists
People from Mountain View, California
People on the autism spectrum
People with factitious disorders
Writers from Burlington, Vermont
YouTube vloggers
American non-binary writers